The Israelite Cemetery is the only Jewish cemetery in Uruguay. It was established 28 November 1917. There are sections dedicated to Jews of different origins: Sephardim, Hungarian, German, Ashkenazim, etc.

In 2014, QR codes were being implemented for its tombstones, in order to enable web access to images and location data for every tomb there.  It is claimed to be the first cemetery in the world to have introduced this innovation.

See also
 History of the Jews in Uruguay

References

External links
 Cementerio Israelita
 

1917 establishments in Uruguay
Ashkenazi Jewish culture in Uruguay
Cemeteries in Canelones Department
German-Jewish diaspora
Hungarian-Jewish diaspora
Jewish cemeteries
Jews and Judaism in Uruguay
La Paz, Canelones
Organizations established in 1917
Sephardi Jewish culture in Uruguay